The Brazilian ironclad Silvado was originally ordered by Paraguay in 1864 with the name Nemesis, but was sold to Brazil when Paraguay could not make the final payments. She participated in the 1864–70 War of the Triple Alliance between Brazil, Argentina and Uruguay against Paraguay.

Design and description
Lima Barros displaced  and was fitted with a ram bow. Her crew consisted of 170 officers and enlisted men. The ship had a pair of horizontal trunk steam engines, each driving one propeller shaft. She was barque-rigged with three pole masts and a bowsprit.

Lima Barros was armed with four 70-pounder Whitworth rifled, muzzle-loading guns mounted in two twin-gun turrets. The gun turret was also protected by 4.5 inches of armor.

Construction and service
Silvado, named after Captain Americo Brasilio Silvado, who was killed when his ship, the ironclad , struck a mine and sank, was originally ordered by Paraguay from the French shipbuilding firm of Arman Brothers, and was laid down in 1864 with the name of Nemesis at their Bordeaux shipyard. She was purchased by Brazil the following year, after the start of the war when Paraguay was cut off from the outside world and could no longer make payments. The ship was launched in 1865 and completed on 15 September 1866.

Footnotes

References

External links
 Brief history of Silvado 

Nemesis
Ironclad warships of the Brazilian Navy
1865 ships